Glumovo may refer to:
 Glumovo, Haskovo Province, Bulgaria
 Glumovo, Saraj, North Macedonia